Sam Lev is an Israeli bridge player.

Bridge accomplishments

Wins

 Cavendish Invitational Pairs (2) 1992, 2004
 North American Bridge Championships (7)
 Senior Knockout Teams (1) 2008 
 Jacoby Open Swiss Teams (2) 1999, 2004 
 Reisinger (2) 1989, 1991 
 Vanderbilt (1) 2002 
 von Zedtwitz Life Master Pairs (1) 1999

Runners-up

 World Olympiad Seniors Teams Championship (2) 2008, 2012
 Cavendish Invitational Pairs (2) 1994, 2008
 North American Bridge Championships (11)
 Grand National Teams (2) 2012, 2013 
 Jacoby Open Swiss Teams (1) 2013 
 Blue Ribbon Pairs (1) 1990 
 Mitchell Board-a-Match Teams (3) 2000, 2003, 2005 
 Spingold (1) 1991 
 Vanderbilt (2) 1993, 2001 
 von Zedtwitz Life Master Pairs (1) 2000

Notes

External links
 

Israeli contract bridge players
Jewish contract bridge players